Directions is the 1992 second album by the Billboard 100 charting group PC Quest.   Like their first album, most of the songs were written by one or both of the songwriting team of Tim James and Steven McClintock (best known for their work with 1980s pop singer Tiffany).  Tiffany would later re-record a few of these songs on her 1993 Dreams Never Die album which was also produced by George Tobin.

Track listing 
"Cathy's Clown" (Don Everly) – 3:29
"If Love Is Blind" (Steve McClintock, Tim James) – 3:42
"I Have to go on Alone" (Tim James, Mike Piccirillo) – 3:35
"(She's Not) A Bad Girl" (Mike Piccirillo) – 4:27
"Almost in Love" (Tim James, Mike Piccirillo) – 4:31
"Nothing but a Fool" (Barbara Amesbury) – 5:01
"We Could Be Trouble" (Tim James, Mike Piccirillo) – 3:36
"Can't You See?" (Steve McClintock, Tim James, John Duarte, Monty Brinkley) – 3:48
"Life Goes On" (Tim James, Mike Piccirillo) – 3:54
"I Wanna Touch You" (Steve McClintock, Tim James, John Duarte) – 4:36
"It Must Be Love" (Chad Petree, Steve Petree, Drew Nichols, Kim Whipkey, John Duarte) – 5:10

Personnel 

Lynn Bugai – stylist
John Duarte – arranger, keyboards, programming, producer, string arrangements, mixing
Caroline Greyshock – photography
Steve Hall – mastering
Dan Higgins – saxophone
Chuck Hohn – engineer
Keith Howland – guitar
James Jowers – engineer
Ria Lewerke – art direction
Drew Nichols – guitar
Helena Occhipinti – make-up, hair stylist
PC Quest – vocals (background)
Mike Piccirillo – musician
Carol Roy – logo design
Robert Russell – engineer, digital editing, mixing
George Tobin – producer
Kirt Wan – scratching
Mark Wolfson – engineer

References

External links
Information on Discogs about Directions album including Credits
Information on the official McJames Music website

1992 albums